The Tokyo Shimbun Hai (Japanese 東京新聞杯) is a Grade 3 horse race for Thoroughbreds aged four and over, run in February over a distance of 1600 metres on turf at Tokyo Racecourse.

The Tokyo Shimbun Hai was first run in 1951 and has held Grade 3 status since 1984. The race was originally run over 2400 metres but the distance was cut to 2200 metres in 1968, 2100 metres in 1969, 2000 metres in 1971 and to 1600 metres in 1984. It was run at Nakayama Racecourse in 1965, 1968 and 2003.

Winners since 2000

Earlier winners

 1984 - Symboli York
 1985 - Dokan Yashima
 1986 - Gallop Dyna
 1987 - Ebisu George
 1988 - Kailos Amon
 1989 - Tosho Mario
 1990 - Houkuto Helios
 1991 - Horino Winner
 1992 - Narcisse Noir
 1993 - Kyowa Hoseki
 1994 - Sekitei Ryo O
 1995 - Golden Eye
 1996 - Trot Thunder
 1997 - Best Tie Up
 1998 - Big Sunday
 1999 - King Halo

See also
 Horse racing in Japan
 List of Japanese flat horse races

References

Turf races in Japan